Eddie Garcia (May 2, 1929 – June 20, 2019) was a Filipino actor and director. He worked in almost 700 film and television roles in a career spanning seven-decades. His best regarded works include: Beast of the Yellow Night (1971), The Woman Hunt (1972), Atsay (1978), Magdusa ka! (1986), Saan Nagtatago ang Pag-ibig? (1987), Asin at Paminta (1999), Deathrow (2000), The Debut (2001), Abakada... Ina (2001), Bwakaw (2012), ML, Hintayan ng Langit, and Rainbow's Sunset (2018).

Filmography

Television

Film

1940s

1950s

1960s

1970s

1980s

1990s

2000s

2010s

Director

Historia de Un Amor (1963)
Kalaban ng Sindikato (1965)
G-2: Taga-usig ng Kaaway (1965)
Sabotage (1966)
Deadline Agosto 13 (1966)
Blackmail (1966)
Pinagbuklod ng Langit (1969)
Atsay (1978)
P.S. I Love You (1981)
Sinasamba Kita (1982)
Cross My Heart (1982)
Forgive and Forget (1982)
Friends in Love (1982)
Kailan Sasabihing Mahal Kita (1985)
Palimos ng Pag-ibig (1986)
Magdusa Ka (1986)
Huwag Mong Itanong Kung Bakit? (1986)
Saan Nagtatago ang Pag-ibig (1987)
Kung Aagawin mo ang Lahat sa Akin (1987)
Kung Kasalanan Man (1989)
Imortal (1989)
Hinukay Ko na ang Libingan Mo (1991)
Abakada Ina (2001)
Crisis (2005)

References

External links

Male actor filmographies
Philippine filmographies